Alex was the name of an interactive videotex information service offered by Bell Canada in market research from 1988 to 1990 and thence to the general public until 1994.

The Alextel terminal was based on the French Minitel terminals, built by Northern Telecom and leased to customers for $7.95/month. It consisted of a CRT display, attached keyboard, and a 1200 bit/s modem for use on regular phone lines. In 1991 proprietary software was released for IBM PCs that allowed computer users to access the network. Communications on the Alex network was via DATAPAC X.25 protocol.

The system operated in the same fashion as Minitel, whereby users connected to various content providers over the X.25 network and thus access was normally through a local telephone number. The most popular (and most expensive) sites were chat rooms. Also offered was an electronic white pages and yellow pages directory. Many users terminated their subscription upon receiving their first invoice. One subscriber racked up a monthly fee of over C$2,000 spending most of his online time in chat.

History 
The motivation to develop the Alex terminal and online service came from competitive pressure from France's Minitel, which had expanded into the Quebec market.

Bell Canada received approval from the CRTC to offer the online service as of November 1988.

The advent of the World Wide Web contributed to making this service obsolete. On April 29, 1994, Bell Canada sent a letter to its customers announcing that the service would be terminated on June 3, 1994. In that letter, Mr. T.E. Graham, then Director of Business Planning for Bell Advanced Communications, stated that "Quite simply, the ALEX network is not the right vehicle, nor the appropriate technology, at this time to deliver the information goods needed in our fast-paced society."

The Alextel terminal is reportedly usable as a dumb terminal for VT100 emulation.

Further reading 

 Proulx, Serge (1991). "The Videotex Industry in Québec: The Difficulties of Mass Marketing Telematics". Canadian Journal of Communication. Université du Québec à Montréal. 16 (3).

See also
 Prestel
 Telidon
 Viewdata
 ICON (microcomputer), a computer system used in Ontario schools from 1984 to 1994.

References

External links 

"Alextel". Personal Computer Museum. Retrieved March 20, 2020

Computer-related introductions in 1988
1988 establishments in Canada
1994 disestablishments in Canada
Videotex
Pre–World Wide Web online services
Legacy systems
Bell Canada
Telecommunications in Canada
History of telecommunications in Canada
Information technology in Canada